Euphorbia dulcis, sweet spurge, is a species in the genus Euphorbia, native to Europe. It is not as acrid as other Euphorbia species, hence the epithet which means "sweet". The cultivar 'Chameleon', with purple foliage, is the one most commonly planted in gardens.

References

dulcis
Garden plants of Europe
Plants described in 1753